Tonkinosoma tiani, is a species of millipede belonging to the family Paradoxosomatidae. It is found from caves in southern China.

Etymology
The specific name tiani is in honor of Prof. Mingyi Tian, one of collector from South China Agricultural University.

Description
Body length is 25–27 mm in both sexes. In Head, frons densely pilose and vertex smooth. Antennae slender and long. Body uniformly dark to pale yellow. Body has 20 segments. Epiproct tip is truncated, with four spinnerets. Legs long and slender.

References

Animals described in 2018
Polydesmida